Camille Trouverie is a French paralympic archer. He competed at the 1960 and 1968 Summer Paralympics.

Biography 
Trouverie competed at the 1960 Summer Paralympics, winning the gold medal in the men's Columbia round open event. Trouverie scored 550 points. He also competed at the 1968 Summer Paralympics, finishing seventh in the men's albion round open event, but winning a bronze medal in the men's albion round team open event along with David and Ventadour. He also competed in the men's FITA round open event, in which he finished in 19th place.

References

External links 
Paralympic Games profile

Possibly living people
Place of birth missing (living people)
Year of birth missing (living people)
French male archers
Paralympic archers of France
Paralympic medalists in archery
Archers at the 1960 Summer Paralympics
Archers at the 1968 Summer Paralympics
Medalists at the 1960 Summer Paralympics
Medalists at the 1968 Summer Paralympics
Paralympic gold medalists for France
Paralympic bronze medalists for France